This was the second tournament held in 1991 at the city of Guarujá. Patrick Baur was the champion in February. He lost in the second round to Andrés Gómez.

Javier Frana won the title by defeating Markus Zoecke 2–6, 7–6(7–1), 6–3 in the final.

Seeds

Draw

Finals

Top half

Bottom half

References

External links
 Official results archive (ATP)
 Official results archive (ITF)

1991 ATP Tour
1991